The 1841 Chicago mayoral election saw Democratic nominee Francis Cornwall Sherman defeat Whig nominee Isaac R. Gavin by a 4.7 point margin.

The election was held on March 5.

Sherman was a former alderman and the proprietor of the Sherman House Hotel

Prior elections had been conducted in a manner requiring voters to state their party preference upon entering their polling place. This election was conducted in a manner which provided voters more privacy/anonymity than the previous four mayoral elections had.

Results

References

Mayoral elections in Chicago
Chicago
1840s in Chicago